Foel Rhudd is a top of Esgeiriau Gwynion in north Wales. It top a wide area of peat bog, the summit marked only by a few stones. Esgeiriau Gwynion summit is directly to the west, separated by a small col of peat hags. Llechwedd Du is connected to the south by a small ridge.

References

Llanuwchllyn
Mountains and hills of Gwynedd
Mountains and hills of Snowdonia
Nuttalls